The Tregoe Education Forum (renamed TregoED in 2010) was established in 1993 by Benjamin Tregoe, co-founder of Kepner-Tregoe. TregoED is a non-profit educational organization whose purpose is to help K12 students and educators learn to solve problems using critical thinking and decision-making strategies.  TregoED applies modified versions of Kepner-Tregoe’s rational thinking processes by using workshops and online tools geared towards school and district leaders, teachers, and students.

TregoED works with K12 schools and districts across the US and Canada.

References

External links
Official website

Critical thinking skills
Educational organizations based in the United States
Problem solving